A fishing stage is a wooden vernacular building, typical of the rough traditional buildings associated with the cod fishery in Newfoundland, Canada.  Stages are located at the water's edge or "landwash", and consist of an elevated platform on the shore with working tables and sheds at which fish are landed and processed for salting and drying. Traditionally, they are painted with a red ochre paint, though colours other than red are sometimes seen.

See also
Fish flake
Heritage Foundation of Newfoundland and Labrador
Newfoundland and Labrador
Newfoundland outport

References

External links
 Fisheries Heritage
 Fishing Stage fishing discussion forum

Buildings and structures in Newfoundland and Labrador
Stage